Nataliya Nikolayevna Smal (born 10 March 1983 in Koriukivka Raion, Ukraine) is a Ukrainian judoka and sambist. She competed in the 70 kg event at the 2008 Summer Olympics, where she lost in the third round to Annett Böhm, and the 2012 Summer Olympics where she lost in the first round to Cecilia Blanco.

References

External links
 
 
 

1983 births
Living people
Ukrainian female judoka
Ukrainian sambo practitioners
Judoka at the 2008 Summer Olympics
Judoka at the 2012 Summer Olympics
Olympic judoka of Ukraine
Sambo practitioners at the 2019 European Games
European Games medalists in sambo
European Games bronze medalists for Ukraine
Sportspeople from Chernihiv Oblast
21st-century Ukrainian women